The Ognissanti is a Baroque style, Roman Catholic church located on Corso Vittorio Emanuele in Mantua, Lombardy, Italy.

History
It is reputed that Matilde of Canossa granted the Ognissanti church around 1080 to the Abbey of Polirone in San Benedetto Po. Others ascribe the donation to the Benedictines as a gift by Pope Adrian IV in 1159.

The present church and façade were completed by 1755, creating a new church with stood at right angles to the original structure. The belltower and the chapel of the dead retain some of the original Romanesque architecture. In 1797, the order was suppressed by the Napoleonic occupation and the church briefly deconsecrated. 

The interior contains the following artworks:
 St Benedetto and St Scolastica surrounded by Saints and Angels by Ippolito Andreasi in presbytery.
 Presentation of John the Baptist, altarpiece, by Ippolito Andreasi.
 Madonna with Child and St Anne, altarpiece by Giuseppe Bazzani.
 St Mauro healing the Sick by Giovanni Cadioli.
 Crowned Madonna and Child with St Benedetto, St John the Baptist and two donors, by Nicolò Solimani da Verona from 1463 found in Chapel of the Dead.

Sources
Arte fede storia. Le chiese di Mantova e provincia, Roberto Brunelli - Gianfranco Ferlisi - Irma Pagliari - Giuseppina Pastore, Edizioni Tre Lune, Mantova (2004)

Roman Catholic churches in Mantua
Baroque architecture in Mantua
18th-century Roman Catholic church buildings in Italy